Di Benedetto (sometimes spelled DiBenedetto) is an Italian surname. Notable people with this name include:
 (1664–1729), Italian architect
Antonio di Benedetto (1922–1986), Argentine writer
 (born 1966), Italian jazz singer
Giuseppe Di Benedetto (born 1946), Italian heart surgeon
Ida Di Benedetto (born 1945), Italian actress
Joseph DiBenedetto, associated with the New York-based Lucchese crime family
Justin DiBenedetto (born 1988), Canadian hockey player
Maria Domenica Di Benedetto (born 1953), Italian electrical engineer
Maria-Gabriella Di Benedetto (born 1958), Italian electrical engineer
Marco Di Benedetto (born 1995), Italian footballer
Matt DiBenedetto (born 1991), Italian-American racing driver
Pietro di Benedetto dei Franceschi (c. 1415 – 1492), Italian Renaissance painter and mathematician
Thomas R. DiBenedetto (born 1949), American businessman, chair of AS Roma
Vincenzo Di Benedetto (1934–2013), Italian philologist
Zanobi di Benedetto Strozzi (1412–1468), Italian Renaissance painter

See also
Benedetto